Argesis may refer to:
Argiza, a town in ancient Mysia, Anatolia
Argeș River, in Romania